The Sheriff of Nottingham is the main antagonist of the 2006 BBC television series, Robin Hood.  Keith Allen's portrayal was described by The Hollywood Reporter as "very camp in the Alan Rickman tradition of sardonic villains," referring to Rickman's role as the Sheriff in the 1991 film Robin Hood: Prince of Thieves. Sarcastic and with a dark sense of humour, he has many catch phrases, including "La di da di da!" and "A clue: no" (also the title of the first season finale). He also has an explosive temper, usually triggered by Robin's interference or the repeated failures of Guy of Gisbourne and other minions. He has many insults for his servants when they fail him, including "blithering oafs", "incompetent fools" and "idiotic buffoons".

Vaisey became the Sheriff a few years before Robin's return to England, taking over from Marian's father Edward. He has used the position to become the leading figure in the 'Black Knights', a group conspiring to overthrow King Richard in favour of Prince John. As a plot device to explain why Robin does not kill the Sheriff, John insures the latter's life by promising to destroy Nottingham should he be killed. In "Sisterhood," the Sheriff's sister Davina is introduced, with whom he displays previously unseen affection. Davina dies in his arms after an altercation with Robin, for which the Sheriff vows revenge.

Keith Allen lost one of his teeth while filming a fight sequence for the show. This was written into the script, with the Sheriff losing a tooth in the last episode of Series 1. He takes teeth from skulls and places them in the gap in his teeth as a recurring gag in the second series. In the third series, Prince John plays the Sheriff off against Gisbourne until in "Do You Love Me?" they finally fight to the death and the Sheriff is killed by Gisbourne, or so Gisbourne thinks - it is shown at the end of the episode that the Sheriff survived; as his apparently dead body is carted away, his fingers twitch. Vaisey returns to Nottingham after Isabella loses it to Robin Hood and the people. He is assisted by Blamire, Isabella's second-in-command, and it is later revealed that he has formed an alliance with Isabella. In a deadly confrontation with Robin and Gisborne, he ends up killing Gisborne. He is finally killed by a dying Robin (who has been poisoned by Isabella). who fires a burning arrow into the barrels of byzantine fire stored in the castle. Vaisey just has enough time to notice the barrels before the entire castle is blown up - and him, Isabella and their remaining men along with it.

References

Fictional murderers
Fictional nobility
Fictional sheriffs